Unión Deportiva Marinaleda is a Spanish football team based in Marinaleda, in the autonomous community of Andalusia. Founded in 1986, it plays in Tercera Andaluza, holding home games at Jornalero Stadium, with a 1,500-seat capacity.

In 2012–13 season, played in Primera Andaluza until January 2013 when withdrew from competition due to being unable to raise funds for pay its players and refereeing's taxes until end of season.  

In 2017-18 season, the team returns and starts in Tercera Andaluza.

Season to season

3 seasons in Tercera División

References

External links
Futbolme.com profile 
lapreferente.com profile

Football clubs in Andalusia
Association football clubs established in 1986
Divisiones Regionales de Fútbol clubs
1986 establishments in Spain